Marguerite van Eeden (born 6 June) is a South African actress and photographer. She is best known for her Afrikaans-language film roles in Vaselinetjie and Vergeet My Nie.

Early life
Originally from the Cape, van Eeden grew up in Botswana. She attended boarding school at La Rochelle Girls' High School in Paarl, matriculating in 2015. She studied both undergraduate and postgraduate studies at Stellenbosch University.

Career
At the age of 15, Van Eeden signed with MPM Acting Agency. She first appeared onscreen in a Coca-Cola commercial and made her television debut with a guest role in a 2016 episode of the crime series Die Byl.

During her first year of university at Stellenbosch, Van Eeden was cast in the titular role of the 2017 drama film Vaselinetjie, an adaptation of the 2004 novel of the same name by Namibian author Anoeschka von Meck. That same year, she began playing Anita in the series Sara se Geheim, a recurring character she would play for two seasons, and a younger version of Milan Murray's character in the series Waterfront.

From 2018 to 2020, Van Eeden starred in three season of Fynskrif as Alex Kruger. Van Eeden starred as Mardaleen Coetzer in the 2020 Afrikaans romcom Vergeet my nie, which earned her an award at for Best Actress at the Silver Screen Film Festival	 (Silwerskermfees). In 2021, she joined the cast of the kykNET series Afgrond as Hannelie Fourie.

Personal life
In April 2018, Van Eeden became engaged to musician Danie du Toit of the Afrikaans band Spoegwolf.

Filmography

Film

Television

References

External links
 
 Marguerite van Eeden at TVSA

Living people
21st-century South African actresses
South African film actresses
White Botswana people
South African women photographers
Stellenbosch University alumni
Year of birth missing (living people)